Anaxibia is the name of six characters in Greek mythology.

Anaxibia, one of the Danaïdes, married to Archelaus, son of Aegyptus.
Anaxibia, a naiad of the Ganges river. She fled from the advances of Helios, but she disappeared in Artemis's sanctuary on Mount Koryphe.
Anaxibia, mother of Maeander by Cercaphus.
Anaxibia, daughter of Bias and Iphianassa, and niece of Melampus. She married Pelias, King of Iolcus, to whom she bore Acastus, Pisidice, Pelopia, Hippothoe, Alcestis, and Medusa. She was sometimes called Alphesiboea or Phylomache, daughter of Amphion.
Anaxibia, daughter of Cratieus. She married Nestor and is the mother of Pisidice, Polycaste, Perseus (son of Nestor), Stratichus, Aretus, Echephron, Peisistratus, Antilochus, and Thrasymedes. More commonly, Eurydice of Pylos is considered to be Nestor's wife and the mother of these children.
Anaxibia, daughter of Atreus and Aerope or, alternatively, of Pleisthenes and Aerope or Pleisthenes and Cleolla (daughter of Dias), and sister of Agamemnon and Menelaus. She married Strophius, king of Phocis, becoming mother of Pylades. Anaxibia was also known as Astyoche or Cydragora.

Notes

References 

Apollodorus, The Library with an English Translation by Sir James George Frazer, F.B.A., F.R.S. in 2 Volumes, Cambridge, MA, Harvard University Press; London, William Heinemann Ltd. 1921. ISBN 0-674-99135-4. Online version at the Perseus Digital Library. Greek text available from the same website.
Gaius Julius Hyginus, Fabulae from The Myths of Hyginus translated and edited by Mary Grant. University of Kansas Publications in Humanistic Studies. Online version at the Topos Text Project.
Hesiod, Catalogue of Women from Homeric Hymns, Epic Cycle, Homerica translated by Evelyn-White, H G. Loeb Classical Library Volume 57. London: William Heinemann, 1914. Online version at theio.com
Homer, The Odyssey with an English Translation by A.T. Murray, PH.D. in two volumes. Cambridge, MA., Harvard University Press; London, William Heinemann, Ltd. 1919. . Online version at the Perseus Digital Library. Greek text available from the same website.
Lucius Mestrius Plutarchus, Morals translated from the Greek by several hands. Corrected and revised by. William W. Goodwin, PH. D. Boston. Little, Brown, and Company. Cambridge. Press Of John Wilson and son. 1874. 5. Online version at the Perseus Digital Library.
 Pausanias, Description of Greece with an English Translation by W.H.S. Jones, Litt.D., and H.A. Ormerod, M.A., in 4 Volumes. Cambridge, MA, Harvard University Press; London, William Heinemann Ltd. 1918. . Online version at the Perseus Digital Library
Pausanias, Graeciae Descriptio. 3 vols. Leipzig, Teubner. 1903.  Greek text available at the Perseus Digital Library.
 Pseudo-Plutarch, De fluviis, in Plutarch's morals, Volume V, edited and translated by William Watson Goodwin, Boston: Little, Brown & Co., 1874. Online version at the Perseus Digital Library.
Theocritus, Idylls from The Greek Bucolic Poets translated by Edmonds, J M. Loeb Classical Library Volume 28. Cambridge, MA. Harvard University Press. 1912. Online version at theoi.com
Theocritus, Idylls edited by R. J. Cholmeley, M.A. London. George Bell & Sons. 1901. Greek text available at the Perseus Digital Library.

Queens in Greek mythology
Princesses in Greek mythology
Danaids
Naiads
Pylian characters in Greek mythology
Nestor (mythology)
Characters from Iolcus